Ignacio Gabari is a professional racecar driver. Gabari made his Porsche Supercup debut in 2005, competing in one race of the series. Gabari has also had success at lower levels of motorsport.

References

Spanish Champion Hyundai Coupe V6
Spanish Champion Legend Car

Spanish racing drivers
Living people
Year of birth missing (living people)
Sportspeople from Madrid
21st-century Spanish people